Gawsworth  is a civil parish and village in the unitary authority of Cheshire East and the ceremonial county of Cheshire, England. The population of the civil parish at the 2011 census was 1,705. It is one of the eight ancient parishes of Macclesfield Hundred. Twenty acres of the civil parish were transferred to Macclesfield civil parish in 1936

The country houses Gawsworth Old Hall, Gawsworth New Hall and Gawsworth Old Rectory are in the village. The authors of the Cheshire volume of the Buildings of England series state: There is nothing in Cheshire to compare with the loveliness of Gawsworth: three great houses and a distinguished church set around a descending string of pools, all within an enigmatic large-scale formal landscape.

A wood near the village known as Maggotty Wood is the burial place of the eighteenth-century dramatist Samuel "Maggotty" Johnson. His ghost is reputed to haunt the wood.

Governance
Gawsworth Parish Council consists of 9 elected Councillors in two wards, Gawsworth Village and Gawsworth Moss. It is within the Gawsworth Ward of Cheshire East Council. In the UK Parliament it is represented by David Rutley MP for the Macclesfield constituency..

See also

Listed buildings in Gawsworth
St James' Church, Gawsworth
Warren, Cheshire

References

Further reading
Richards, Raymond (1957) The Manor of Gawsworth, Cheshire. (Transactions of the Ancient Monuments Society; Vol. 5, pp. 1–356.) London: Ancient Monuments Society

External links

 

Villages in Cheshire
Civil parishes in Cheshire